Chorizanthe staticoides is a species of flowering plant in the buckwheat family known by the common name Turkish rugging. It is endemic to California, where it is a common member of the flora in the chaparral and scrub habitats in a number of regions.

This is a plant which is quite variable in morphology, producing small patches on the ground or growing erect to heights over half a meter. The leaves measure from just a few millimeters to about 8 centimeters long. Most of them grow at the base of the fuzzy green or reddish stem. The top of the stem branches neatly into flat-topped inflorescences packed densely with tiny flowers. Each flower has a cylindrical base of six sharp-tipped bracts in shades of red to purple or green. Within this involucre is the pink to red flower which is a few millimeters wide and contains nine tiny stamens.

External links

 Calflora Database: Chorizanthe staticoides (Turkish rugging)
Jepson Manual eFlora (TJM2) treatment of Chorizanthe staticoides
UC Photos gallery: Chorizanthe staticoides

staticoides
Endemic flora of California
Natural history of the California chaparral and woodlands
Natural history of the Channel Islands of California
Natural history of the Peninsular Ranges
Natural history of the Santa Monica Mountains
Natural history of the Transverse Ranges
Taxa named by George Bentham
Flora without expected TNC conservation status